The Washington Report on Middle East Affairs (also known as The Washington Report and WRMEA)  magazine, published eight times per year, focuses on "news and analysis from and about the Middle East and U.S. policy in that region". The New York Times has characterized it as "critical of United States policies in the Middle East". In 2005, USA Today called it "a non-partisan publication that has been critical of Bush's policies". Representatives of pro-Israel organizations have criticized the Washington Report on Middle East Affairs as being aligned with the Arab lobby and as "anti-Israel".

Organization
The Washington Report is published by the American Educational Trust (AET), founded in 1982 as a non-profit foundation incorporated in Washington, D.C. under 501(c)4 by retired U.S. foreign service officers including  Andrew Killgore, who was U.S. Ambassador to Qatar when he retired from the United States Foreign Service in 1980 and Richard Curtiss, a former head of the Arabic Service of the Voice of America, who was chief inspector of the U.S. Information Agency when he retired from the United States Foreign Service in 1980. Killgore is the publisher and Curtiss was the Executive Editor until his death in 2013. Delinda C. Hanley, Curtiss's daughter, is the current editor.

AET's Foreign Policy Committee has included former U.S. ambassadors, government officials, and members of the United States Congress, including the late Democratic Senator J. William Fulbright and Republican Senator Charles Percy, both former chairmen of the Senate Foreign Relations Committee. Members of its board of directors and advisory committees "receive no fees for their services".

The Washington Report began in 1982 as a bi-weekly eight-page newsletter and today is a 76-page full-color magazine. It is recognized worldwide as a leader in its field, publishing a wide variety of views from and about the Middle East by Muslim, Jewish and Christian writers, many of whom live or have lived in the region. The magazine's "nonprofit wing has donated 3,200 free subscriptions" and dozens of books to libraries.

Political positions

The Washington Report on Middle East Affairs states its position as follows:
The Washington Report on Middle East Affairs does not take partisan domestic political positions. As a solution to the Israeli–Palestinian conflict, it endorses U.N. Security Council Resolution 242's land-for-peace formula, supported by seven successive U.S. presidents. In general, the Washington Report supports Middle East solutions which it judges to be consistent with the charter of the United Nations and traditional American support for human rights, self-determination and fair play. 

The Washington Report carries articles with perspectives ranging from the Israeli left (e.g., Uri Avnery, Ilan Pappe), to libertarian (e.g., Sheldon Richman and Leon Hadar), to the isolationist U.S. right (e.g., Robert Novak, Pat Buchanan). As long ago as 1990, the publication argued that criticism of Israel (generally defined as Anti-Zionism) should not be equated with antisemitism.

The magazine often publishes articles and letters (both to itself and outside publications) that seek a one-state solution to replace Israel with a state comprising both Israel and the Palestinian territories that would have a large Muslim majority population, and also offers uncritical platforms for the mostly one-state movement of Boycott, Divestment and Sanctions.

In the late 1980s and early 1990s, during the fall of the Soviet Union, the Washington Report wrote about the future of Soviet Jews and stated that most Jews wanted to emigrate to either Europe or the United States rather than Israel and that the arrival of large numbers of emigrants into Israel would harm the economy or lead to an influx of Soviet Jews into the West Bank and Gaza Strip.

The Washington Report publishes listings of pro-Israel political action committee contributions to congressional candidates for each Congress, as well as elected representatives' voting records during each Congress. It also publishes a sum total of direct aid to Israel, which it estimates at almost $114 billion. This resource has been quoted by a number of publications over the years.

The Washington Report has published dozens of articles about the American Israel Public Affairs Committee (AIPAC). In 1989, founders Andrew Killgore and Richard Curtiss joined other plaintiffs in complaining that the Federal Election Commission had improperly refused to label AIPAC a "political action committee" (PAC) and require AIPAC to disclose the sources and uses of money. The case went to the United States Supreme Court. The Supreme Court ruled in a majority decision that the plaintiffs had the right to raise issues regarding AIPAC, but referred the PAC matter back to the FEC because the FEC was drafting its membership threshold rules to directly address the unclear issue. The FEC decided that AIPAC did not spend an amount of time or money on political issues to make it a PAC, and in 2010 the last of WRMEAs appeals to have the FEC ruling reversed was dismissed.

The Washington Report has published a number of articles on Israel's 1967 attack on USS Liberty. James Ennes, a retired Naval lieutenant commander who was on USS Liberty the day of the attack, wrote two articles detailing evidence that the attack was deliberate. The magazine also has published articles on the topic by former representative Paul Findley, former US Ambassador to Saudi Arabia James E. Akins and former Central Intelligence Agency analyst Ray McGovern

In 1996, the magazine reported that the United States Department of Defense and the General Accounting Office had both noted Israeli thefts of U.S. military technology secrets, confirming that Israel had transferred  technology from the largely U.S. taxpayer funded Lavi fighter  program to China. It was one of several publications that pointed out in 2007 that China's Chengdu J-10 fighter bore a striking similarity to the Lavi.

In 1998, the magazine reported on the case of Mohammed Salah, the first American citizen to be placed on the U.S. government list of terrorists after being arrested and imprisoned for five years by Israel, charged with being a member of Hamas. When he returned home, the U.S. seized his assets. Richard Curtiss wrote about the Secret Evidence Repeal Act of 1999, which was motivated in part by the government's use of "secret evidence" to justify seizing Salah's assets. In 1999 Curtiss wrote that Salah alleged he was tortured with beatings by interrogators, including an American-born Israeli, and that evidence was being used by U.S. prosecutors. Curtiss also quoted Salah's comments on his attorney's urging him to help "put Israel on trial". Quoting this, Jeff Breinholt, then Deputy Chief, Counterterrorism Section, United States Department of Justice, criticized Salah's attorneys for pressuring him to use the torture defense, calling it "lawfare". He also defended the judge's decision to allow Israeli interrogators to testify in closed court. In 2007, Salah was acquitted of financing Hamas.

In 2003, the publication wrote that the United States government in that year provided the U.S. Holocaust Museum $38.4 million, or 67 percent of its annual budget, more than it provided to the Kennedy Center for the Performing Arts. It opined that "Americans well might wonder why" when the National World War II Memorial, the National Museum of the American Indian and the National Museum of African American History and Culture were not yet completed, "the U.S. government places a higher priority on a museum dedicated to the victims and survivors of a European horror".

In 2004, AET's Andrew Killgore spearheaded a letter to President George W. Bush signed by a number of former American diplomats objecting to US policy towards Israel and the Palestinians, especially then Prime Minister Ariel Sharon's plan to leave Gaza without bothering to negotiate with Palestinian representatives.

In 2007, Fox News quoted Andrew Killgore on the prosecution of two AIPAC employees in the Lawrence Franklin espionage scandal. Killgore said that although AIPAC was not a registered foreign agent under the law, it was in fact a foreign agent and that the U.S. government should assume intelligence shared with allies "all over the world". He has written at length on the topic in the Washington Report. WRMEA also tied the case into their Akins v. FEC lawsuit, saying it was another reason AIPAC should be declared a foreign PAC, but the efforts died when the FBI withdrew the prosecutions stemming from the Franklin case.

In 2008, a number of publications reported that Mohammed Omer, the Gaza correspondent for the Washington Report, was hospitalized after Israeli soldiers cracked his ribs and inflicted other injuries at a crossing from Jordan into the occupied West Bank. The Israeli government disputed Omer's claims.

Criticism
In 1992, then AIPAC Deputy Director of Research and Information Michael Lewis charged that "Arabists" have become a major problem for Israel in the United States, distributing copies of the Washington Report on Middle East Affairs to an audience as evidence. He also wrote up his critique in AIPAC's Near East Report. The Washington Report printed a rebuttal of Lewis' accusations. In 1997, Michael Lewis accused the Washington Report of promoting conspiracy theories (especially regarding the USS Liberty incident) and publishing reports that accuse Israel and Zionists of being collectively responsible for many issues in the United States and the Middle East. Lewis is now AIPAC's Director of Policy Analysis.

In 2000, Jonathan S. Tobin wrote in Jewish World Review that the publication was "the guidebook to the Arabist lobby in the United States," that it "specializes in defaming Israel",  and that it is "a must-read for friends of Israel who want a reliable indicator of the thinking of the anti-Israel crowd." In a book published in 2002 Rafael Medoff, founding director of the David Wyman Institute for Holocaust Studies, wrote that "in addition to the standard denunciations of Israeli policies, the Washington Report has published articles belittling the magnitude of the Holocaust, listing the names of Jewish publishers of leading U.S. newspapers to demonstrate 'Zionist' control of the media, and accusing Israel of 'Nazi-style' genocide against the Arabs. Each issue is filled with wild conspiracy theories about Israel and pro-Israel lobbying groups, accusing them of orchestrating everything from the Monica Lewinsky scandal to the assassination of John F. Kennedy."

During the George W. Bush administration, the Anti-Defamation League criticized the publication for hosting an essay by Paul Craig Roberts in which he writes the "fanatical neoconservatives and Israelis are using Bush to commit the United States to a catastrophic course." The pro-Israel media watchdog Committee for Accuracy in Middle East Reporting in America ("CAMERA") describes The Washington Report as being "virulently anti-Israel".

In February 2010, Fox News reported that the Washington Report had deleted from a 2007 article a comment by Rashad Hussain, the newly appointed U.S. envoy to the Organisation of the Islamic Conference (OIC), calling the prosecution of Sami Al-Arian a "politically motivated persecution". Editor Delinda Hanley told Fox News she believed the change was made in February 2009, because the comments attributed to Hussain were actually made by Sami al-Arian's daughter, Laila, who also attended the event. But article's author, Shereen Kandil, told Fox News that she had not confused the two people. The White House also attributed the comments to Al-Arian's daughter. (In 2006, Al-Arian had entered a guilty plea to a charge of conspiracy to help people associated with the Palestinian Islamic Jihad.) Hussain himself said he had made the remarks in response to a question from Laila Al-Arian, but had complained to the Washington Report shortly after they were published that they "lacked context", and the publication eventually removed the remarks.

Contributors

Writers for the Washington Report on Middle East Affairs include retired U.S. foreign service officers and people with a wide range of political, national and religious backgrounds. The following is an incomplete list of people who have, at one or more times, contributed to WRMEA:

See also
 Council for the National Interest
 Israel lobby in the United States
 Opposition in the United States to the Israeli occupation

 Middle East International

References

External links
 

Middle Eastern studies in the United States
Mass media about the Arab–Israeli conflict
Political magazines published in the United States
Magazines established in 1982
Magazines published in Washington, D.C.
Eight times annually magazines published in the United States
1982 establishments in Washington, D.C.